Samuel Davis Wilson (August 31, 1881 – August 19, 1939) was an American politician; he served as the 86th Mayor of Philadelphia from 1936 until his death in 1939.

Early life and career
Wilson was born in Boston in 1881. He was educated at the Phillips Exeter Academy.

Career
He moved to Philadelphia in 1905 and by 1927 found work as an assistant to the city controller Will B. Hadley. This brought him in contact with Philadelphia political community. In 1930, he worked as a campaign manager for the Republican Gifford Pinchot’s gubernatorial campaign. This elevated his profile, leading him to a successful candidacy for city controller in 1931. He explored a run for the governor’s mansion in 1931 as a Democrat but dropped out and supported George Earle, who won the election.

He entered the 1935 race for mayor as a Republican after the Democratic Party selected John B. Kelly Sr., a former Olympic rower and the father of Grace Kelly. With the unusually strong challenge from Kelly, Wilson’s campaign at one point resorted to anti-Semitic rhetoric, accusing Kelly of being beholden to Jewish interests. Wilson won the election, but by only 45,000 votes, a strong result for the Democrats in the reliably Republican city.

As mayor, he clashed with Republican leaders and took on the Philadelphia Rapid Transit Company and UGI, the city’s gas operator. In 1937, he re-registered to vote as non-partisan, breaking with the Republican party.

He ran in the Democratic primary election for United States Senate against Governor Earle. He had publicly blamed Earle for wiretaps on his secretary’s phone. The race wasn’t close and Earle won handily by over 500,000 votes with Davis failing to carry any wards in Philadelphia.

Wilson’s actions cost him much of his political support. The district attorney of Philadelphia secured an indictment against him for failure to stop widespread gambling in the city, but a judge dismissed the charges.

He became ill in 1939 and sent a letter to the City Council to have the council president assume his duties on August 11. He died on August 19, 1939 after a stroke. George Connell succeeded him as mayor and served out the rest of his term.

References

List of mayors of Philadelphia at Philadelphia Department of Records

Further reading
 John P. Rossi, "Philadelphia's Forgotten Mayor: S. Davis Wilson", Pennsylvania History, Vol. 51, No. 2 (April, 1984), pp. 154–166.

External links
Samuel Davis Wilson entry at The Political Graveyard

1881 births
1939 deaths
Mayors of Philadelphia
Politicians from Boston
Pennsylvania Republicans
Pennsylvania Democrats
20th-century American politicians
Phillips Exeter Academy alumni